Arinthia Santina Komolafe (née Braynen, born 30 June 1980) is a Bahamian politician who was elected the Leader of the Democratic National Alliance (DNA), one of the three main political parties in the Commonwealth of The Bahamas, on 24 October 2017.  She succeeded Christopher Mortimer, who was appointed as Interim Leader of the DNA on 24 October 2017.  Mortimer was appointed Interim Leader following the DNA's defeat in The Bahamas' General Elections on 10 May 2017, when the Party failed to win a parliamentary seat out of the 39 possible parliamentary seats in the House of Assembly.  Founder and inaugural leader of the DNA, Branville McCartney announced his intention to resign from the Party and front-line politics following the defeat. Komolafe is the first female leader of the DNA political party and other females such as Cynthia Pratt, former Deputy Leader of the Progressive Liberal Party (PLP) and Loretta Butler-Turner, former Deputy Leader of the Free National Movement.

Early life and education 
Komolafe was born Arinthia Santina Braynen on 30 June 1980 at Princess Margaret Hospital in Nassau, New Providence, The Bahamas, in the Farm Road community. Her parents are Bradley Arthur Braynen, a civil servant, and Jenniffer Elaine Braynen (née Harvey) a retired banker, turned protocol and immigration consultant. She is oldest of her parents' four surviving children, two brothers, Anton and Marcus Braynen, and one sister, Anthinear Carroll. Her eldest brother, Brandon Bradley Braynen, died at the age of 39 on 11 July 2016, following complications after surgery.

Komolafe was educated in the Bain & Grants Town community at Willard Patton Primary School and C.R. Walker Secondary High School. Komolafe has pursued studies in Accounting, Finance and Law. She received her Bachelors of Law from the University of Buckingham. She successfully completed all the diplomas for the Society of Trust & Estate Practitioners (STEP) program in 2010.

Marriage, family and faith 
In 2005, she married Emmanuel Komolafe, whom she met at the University of Buckingham, England, in 2001.  The couple were married at Mount Tabor Full Gospel Baptist Church. Their union has produced three children, two daughters and one son: Morgan, Alexandria and Joshua. Arinthia Komolafe is a Christian and was christened and baptized at St. John's Native Baptist Church on New Providence, Bahamas. She and her family worship at the parish of St. Mary's The Virgin Anglican Church.

According to the declared financial declarations, Arinthia Komolafe has assets worth more than one million US dollars  (2021).

Professional career 
In September 2013, Komolafe became the first female Managing Director at the Bahamas Development Bank. She served in the post up to March 2016 when she submitted her resignation to the then Prime Minister and Minister of Finance, Perry Gladstone Christie. During her tenure, Komolafe presided over a "no sacred cows" policy which ensured that political cronies and beneficiaries of nepotism were not spared from being pursued for funds owed to the bank. Other accomplishments she listed as achievements was preparing a strategic plan for the forward movement of the Bank, proposing a corporate governance framework and implementing a robust provisioning policies among other things.

In April 2014, Komolafe was recognised by U.S. Chargé d'Affaires to The Bahamas, John L. Armstrong for her nomination of the U.S. State's Department Global Leadership Mentorship Program. .

Political career 
In 2012, Komolafe was elected as the Chairperson of the New Providence Women's Branch of the Progressive Liberal Party. She previously served as the Secretary of the Women's Branch under the Chairmanship of Manita Wisdom who she succeeded.  During her tenure, Komolafe led a delegation of women to their first meeting at the 57th Session of the Commission on the Status of Women meeting at the United Nations in March 2013.

In January 2017, Komolafe was ratified as a candidate for the Democratic National Alliance in the Killarney constituency and served as the Spokesperson for Financial Services, Trade and Industry and National Insurance in the DNA's shadow cabinet. She was one of thirteen women on the Party's ticket. Her candidacy was opposite the leader of the Free National Movement, Dr. Hubert Minnis.  Komolafe, Minnis and Reneika Knowles, candidate for the Progressive Liberal Party, were officially nominated as candidates for the Killarney constituency for the 2017 General Elections. As the incumbent, Hubert Minnis won the seat for a third consecutive time, securing 4,163 votes, and went on to become the fourth Prime Minister of the Commonwealth of The Bahamas.  Komolafe secured 422 votes after only four months on the campaign trail - the highest of all the DNA female candidates and the third highest of DNA candidates of the 35 candidates fielded by the DNA. The top two votes went to former leader of the DNA, Branville McCartney in the Bamboo Town Constituency (604 votes), and Stephen Greenslade (544 votes), the DNA's candidate for the constituency of Golden Isles.

At a special meeting held on 24 October 2017, Arinthia Komolafe was elected as Deputy Leader of the Democratic National Alliance.  She succeeded Christopher Mortimer, who was appointed as the Interim Leader on 24 October 2017. She announced her intention to seek the Leadership of the DNA via Facebook on 19 February 2019, and went on to defeat fellow challenger Kendal Smith by a decisive 6:1 margin.

Selected writings 
Arinthia Komolafe wrote a weekly column in the Nassau Guardian for five years, from 2012 to 2017.  The articles addressed political and socio-economic issues facing The Bahamas.

 "The Bahamian Dream pt.1", The Nassau Guardian, 20 January 2012.
 "The Bahamian Dream: Part 2", The Bahamas Weekly, 9 February 2012.
 "Self-Imposed Austerity Measures Advisable for Next Government", The Bahamas Weekly, 11 January 2012.
 "A Call to National Conscience", The Bahamas Weekly, 4 May 2012
 "Bahamian Governance: The Age of Prudence", The Bahamas Weekly, 5 February 2013
 "The Changing of the Guard", The Bahamas Weekly, 30 April 2012
 "No Cross No Crown - The Cost of Leadership", The Bahamas Weekly 12 April 2012
 "Jamaican Elections 2011: A prediction of what to expect in The Bahamas in 2012", The Bahamas Weekly 2 January 2012

See also 
In 2014, Arinthia S. Komolafe served as one of the featured speakers in the 2nd Annual Eleuthera Business Outlook (EBO) on April 24, 2014:
 "Chamber Chief Optimistic About Eleuthera's Economic Future", The Bahamas Weekly, 16 April 2014:
In 2018, Komolafe was selected to participate in the U.S. State Department exchange program in 2018, focusing on the U.S. electoral process:
 "Bahamian politician selected to participate in U.S. State Department Exchange program", The Bahamas Weekly, 8 November 2018:

References 

21st-century Bahamian women politicians
21st-century Bahamian politicians
1980 births
Living people
Leaders of political parties